Robert C. Haas is an American former law enforcement official who was the Police Commissioner for the Cambridge, Massachusetts Police Department, and previously served as Secretary of Public Safety and Undersecretary of Law Enforcement and Homeland Security under Massachusetts Governor Mitt Romney, as Chief of Police in Westwood, Massachusetts, and as a police officer in Morris Township, New Jersey.

References

Massachusetts Secretaries of Public Safety
American police chiefs
William Paterson University alumni
Rutgers University alumni
Northeastern University alumni
Living people
People from Cambridge, Massachusetts
Year of birth missing (living people)